The Devil's Horns may refer to:

 Sign of the horns, a hand and two-finger gesture also called Devil's Horns, mano cornuta and corna
"The Devil's Horns", a 1939 story from The Avenger magazine
Proboscidea (plant), a flowering plant sometimes known as Devil's horn and by other names